Herpetogramma salbialis is a moth in the family Crambidae. It was described by George Hampson in 1899. It is found in Veracruz, Mexico, Costa Rica and Honduras.

References

Moths described in 1899
Herpetogramma
Moths of North America